Vladimir Ivanovich Sokalsky (24 April 1863, Heidelberg - 1919, Sevastopol, Russia) was a composer, musical critic, and lawyer.

Biography 

Vladimir Ivanovich Sokalsky was born in the family of Ivan Petrovich Sokalsky, a Russian writer. He graduated from Kharkiv musical school, a branch of the Imperial Russian Musical Community, where studied music from Peter Petrovich Sokalsky, and compositions from Iwan Knorr. He also graduated from Kharkiv University (the faculty of law). He was a conductor of an orchestra in opera-enterprise of Vasily Nikolaevich Andreev-Burlak. Since 1882 contributed as a musical reviewer of the "South country" newspaper, under a pseudonym Don-Diez. At meetings of the Kharkov branch of Russian musical society its products were executed, and the opera "Repka" was performed in Poltave, Smolensk, Tiflis and Kharkov. In 1902 he was a prosecutor at the Ust-Medveditsa district court. In the autumn of 1911, he became the Chairman of the Vologda district Court. In 1918 in Vologda, he performed several lectures and concerts devoted to creativity of Beethoven and Grieg with his daughter Lydia, and son-in-law Ilya Ginetsinsky. In 1919, he went on a holiday to Sevastopol and fell ill with typhus. He died there, and was buried in the town cemetery.

Memory
 The grave in the town cemetery in Sevastopol, was found by the composer M.V. Kovalev, a monument created by architect N.N. Sdobnyakov. On the gray granite lira and the inscription: composer V.I. Sokalsky.
 In Kharkov, a music school named after the composer.

Creative activity
 Symphony in G-moll (Kharkiv), 1894
 Symphony in G minor / Orchestral ed. Borisova; arranged for f.-p. Yu. Rozhavskoy; foreword. Borisova and A.N. Gordeychuk Kiev: Muzichna Ukraine, 1967
 Cello Andante elegiaco
 Piano Pieces op. 1 (Impressions musicales 6 № №);
 Lukashevich K.V. Among the flowers. Fantastic comedy for children in the 2-forth with dancing and singing. Songs arranged by B. Sokalsky. Claudia Lukaszewicz. Ed. 3rd. M., 1914.
 In meadows = Aux champs: entry: Op. 3 № 1 / V.I. Sokalsky, edited by RF Gill. - V. Bessel and Co.. - 5. - (The repertoire of piano works, of works by Russian composers, distributed by the degree of difficulty and marking the correct fingering, and 2 series. 3-er degree. No.11).
 Canzonetta: Op. 1 № 3 / V. Sokalsky; edited by RF Gill. - St.: V. Bessel and Co.. - 3. - (The repertoire of piano pieces from the works of Russian composers, distributed by degree of difficulty and labeled correctly fingering, 2-series. 3-er degree. №).
 Elegie: por cello et piano: Op. 8 / par Wladimir Sokalsky. - Music Store N. Mareček. - 13 sec.
 Elegie: Pur cello et piano: Op. 8 Kharkov: Mareček, B.G.
 Turnip: opera-Tale in the 1 st step: Op. 10: klaviraustsug for singing and piano / libretto Ek. Guy Sagaidachny (on the theme of folk tales), music V.I. Sokalsky. - P. Jurgenson. - 75 sec.
 Turnip: Opera-tale in a village: Op. 10 / Libretto Ek. Guy Sagaidachny (on bunks. Tales); Moose. V.I. Sokalsky, Leipzig: M.M.Jurgenson, qualification. 1899
 Guy Sagaidachnya Ek. (1856? -1916) Turnip: Picture in a village for children (on the theme of children. Tales): Libretto / [Op.] Ek. Guy Sagaidachnya; Moose. V.I. Sokalsky. Kharkov: Tipo-lit. "Pecs. Case," the book. K.N. Gagarin, 1900
 Turnip: Opera-tale in a 1-m D.: Op. 10 / Libretto Ek. Guy Sagaidachnya (on bunks. Tales); Moose. V.I. Sokalsky M.: Gos. publ. Mus. Sector, 1924
 Minuet: Op. 1 № 4 / V. Sokalsky, published under the editorship of R.F. Gill. - St.: V. Bessel and Co.. - 5. - (The repertoire of piano pieces from the works of Russian composers distributed by degree of difficulty and labeled correctly fingering, Series 2. Degre 4-me № 1).
 The mowers: Op. 3 № 2 / V. Sokalsky, published under the editorship of R.F. Gill. - St. : B. Bessel and Co.. - 5. - (The repertoire of piano pieces from the works of Russian composers distributed by degree of difficulty and labeled correctly fingering, Series 2. Degre 3-me № 12).
 The play / V. Sokalsky; shifted. and ed. Party Viola M. Greenberg Kiev: Moose. Ukraine, 1980
 Au berceau: For f.- p.: Op. 1, № 5 St. Petersburg. : Bessel and K °, B.G.

Romances
 At bedtime: In one voice with the ACC. PT.: d.1-g.2: Op. 16, № 2 KA. N. Ogarev. Moscow: P. Jurgenson, B.G. - 5
 Wood: for baritone: Op. 6 / words by A. Koltsov, music by V. Sokalsky. - M.; Pg. : P. Jurgenson. - 11 sec. - (Romances for one voice with piano music. Music V. Sokalsky).
 Every time I see thee: ballad / words Y.I. Shpazhinsky; music V.I. Sokalsky. -Music Store I. Mareček. - 7. - (Music Romansy. V. Sokalsky).
 Every time I see you: Romance: To vote with the OP.: C-fis.1 / Sl. Y.I. Shpazhinsky Kharkov: Moose. Mag. N. Mareček, qualification. 1900.
 I come to you with greetings: To vote with the OP.: Dis.1-a.2: Op. 16, № 3 KA. Fet, Moscow: P. Jurgenson, B.G.
 Oh, the honor is a fine fellow: c.1-f.2 / Sl. Tolstoy Kharkov: Moose. Mag. N. Mareček, qualification. 1903 - 5. - (Romances and songs to be sung to the accompaniment of a piano;
 Why? /  Music V.I.Sokalsky. - North Lyra: A. Zeyvanga. - 5.
 "Why?" : For voice and f.-p.; c.1-f.2 Kharkov: Mareček, qualification. 1905
 I shook his hand to you ... : Song / words J.N. Shpazhinsky; music V.I. Sokalsky, Italian lang. translated G. Astillero. - Music Store N. Mareček. - 7. - (Romansy. Music V. Sokalsky).
 I shook his hand to you: Romance: To vote with the OP.: Cf.1 / Sl. Y.I. Shpazhinsky; to Italy. lang. per. Astillero Kharkov: Moose. Mag. N. Mareček, qualification. 1900
 Elegy: Op. 2 № 3 / words by A. Pushkin; music V.I. Sokalsky. - Vasily Bessel and Co.. - 5. - (Six songs. Music V. Sokalsky; 3).
 Dvi p'esi: Transkr. for violoncheli i f.-p. Mr. Pecker Kiev: Mistetstvo, 1952
 Oh May, May: dis.1-g.2 / Song of the Taras Shevchenko Kiev: Moose. Mag. N. Mareček, qualification. 1903
 Song.- Moscow: Muzgiz, 1954
 Romances: To vote with the accompanying. PT. / Comp. and author. foreword. Z.B. Yuferova Kiev: Moose. Ukraine, 1991

Literature 
 Yuferova Z. B. Outstanding figure of Ukrainian musical culture composer and critic V. Sokalsky (1863–1919). Cand. Dis. for obtaining scientific. degree candidate. Art. (821) Kiev, 1971.
 Кириллова Э. А. Вологда музыкальная: век ХХ. — Вологда, 2001. — с.3, 13, 14, 29.

Notes

External links 
 Big Biographical Encyclopedia: Sokalsky 
 Photo of Vladimir Sokalsky
 

1863 births
1919 deaths
Russian male classical composers
Russian music educators
Russian Romantic composers
National University of Kharkiv alumni
Deaths from typhus
Musicians from Heidelberg
20th-century Russian male musicians
19th-century male musicians
Pupils of Iwan Knorr